Miss Baek is a 2018 South Korean drama film directed by Lee Ji-won and starring Han Ji-min, Kim Si-a, and Lee Hee-joon. The film was released in South Korea on October 11, 2018.

Plot
The story of a woman who grew up abused and neglected, meets a little girl with similar past whom she is determined to save.

Cast
Han Ji-min as Baek Sang-ah
Kim Bo-min as young Sang-ah 
Kim Si-a as Kim Ji-eun 
Lee Hee-joon as Jang-Sup
Kwon So-hyun as Joo Mi-kyung 
Baek Soo-jang as Kim Il-kon
Kim Sun-young as Jang Hoo-nam
Jeon Seok-ho as Detective Bae
Lee Joo-young as Yoo Jang-mi
Lee Jung-eun as a Message parlor owner
Jo Min-joon as Detective Kang
Yoon Song-ah a Social Worker
Kim Joon-bum as Lecturer Jo
Jung Kyung-ho as a Police chief
Kim Ho-chang as a man police officer
Yoo Jung-rae as a woman police officer
Shin Soo-jung as Nurse Shin
Kim Ji-hye as Nurse Kim
Hong Sung-ho as Lecturer Ma
Park Ki-sun as a grandfather in Car Center
Han Yong-hwan as a Courier
Kim Ji-hee as a neighborhood woman
Sung Hyun-mi as a Super Auntie
Keum Dong-hyun as a Super Uncle
Kim Dae-in as the former male student
Kim Min-ki as a man
Jang Young-nam as Jung Myung-sook (cameo)

Release
The film was released on October 11, 2018, with an age 15-rating, for some violence and language.

The film was selected to screen at the 31st Tokyo International Film Festival and at the Stories of Woman program of the 3rd London East Asia Film Festival in London on October 25, 2018.

Reception
On its opening day, the film grossed  from 21,891 attendance and finished in third place. The film finished in third place during its debut weekend, grossed  from 161,468 attendance, tailing Dark Figure of Crime and Venom. During its second weekend, the film fell to fourth place with  gross, though dropping just 11% in gross compared to its debut weekend. On November 3, the film surpassed its break-even point at 700.000 attendance.

As of November 18, 2018, the film grossed  from 721,183 total attendance.

Awards and nominations

References

External links
 
 
 

2018 films
2010s Korean-language films
South Korean drama films
2018 drama films
2018 directorial debut films
2010s South Korean films